Dulkaninna Station is a pastoral lease that once operated as a sheep station but now operates as a cattle station in outback South Australia.

The property is composed of a variety of land systems including gibber plains, black soil flood plains, sand-hill country, table land country and creek systems. Lake Gregory is in the north-east corner of the property. It shares a boundary with Clayton Station to the south-west, Murnpeowie to the south-east and Etadunna Station to the north.

The Bell family own the property and have down so for over 110 years. The property runs a herd of Poll Hereford crossed with Black Angus and also breeds stock and quarter horses.

Geological surveys were conducted in the area in 1885 with bores also being sunk in the area at the same time.

Once part of the Mundowdna run that was owned by Sidney Kidman, a  block called Dulkaninna North East, was resumed by the Department of Lands in 1896, and the lease was acquired by George William Barrett. In 1914 the property was owned by Messrs Sinclair, Scott and Company with both sheep and cattle being run at the station.

The property was abandoned in 1920. By 1923 the property was owned by the Avon Downs Pastoral Company. The Bell family acquired the property in 1933. In 1935 the property was suffering a dry spell with D. D. Bell, the owner, intending to start breeding horses at Dulkaninna again. Bell had a pedal wireless installed in the homestead at some time prior to 1929.

His son Daryl took over the property.

The land occupying the extent of the Dulkaninna pastoral lease was gazetted by the Government of South Australia as a locality in April 2013 under the name 'Dulkaninna'.

See also
List of ranches and stations

References

Stations (Australian agriculture)
Pastoral leases in South Australia
Far North (South Australia)